Le Chevalier C. Auguste Dupin  is a fictional character created by Edgar Allan Poe. Dupin made his first appearance in Poe's 1841 short story "The Murders in the Rue Morgue", widely considered the first detective fiction story. He reappears in "The Mystery of Marie Rogêt" (1842) and "The Purloined Letter" (1844).

Dupin is not a professional detective and his motivations for solving the mysteries change throughout the three stories. Using what Poe termed "ratiocination", Dupin combines his considerable intellect with creative imagination, even putting himself in the mind of the criminal. His talents are strong enough that he appears able to read the mind of his companion, the unnamed narrator of all three stories.

Poe created the Dupin character before the word detective had been coined. The character laid the groundwork for fictional detectives to come, including Sherlock Holmes, and established most of the common elements of the detective fiction genre.

Character background and analysis

Dupin is from what was once a wealthy family, but "by a variety of untoward events" has been reduced to more humble circumstances, and contents himself only with the basic necessities of life. He now lives in Paris with his close friend, the anonymous narrator of the stories. The two met by accident while both were searching for "the same rare and very remarkable volume" in an obscure library. This scene, the two characters searching for a hidden text, serves as a metaphor for detection. They promptly move to an old manor located in Faubourg Saint-Germain. For hobbies, Dupin is "fond" of enigmas, conundrums, and hieroglyphics. He bears the title Chevalier, meaning that he is a knight in the Légion d'honneur. Dupin shares some features with the later gentleman detective, a character type that became common in the Golden Age of Detective Fiction. He is acquainted with police prefect "G.", who appears in all three stories seeking his counsel.

In "The Murders in the Rue Morgue", Dupin investigates the murder of a mother and daughter in Paris. He investigates another murder in "The Mystery of Marie Rogêt". This story was based on the true story of Mary Rogers, a saleswoman at a cigar store in Manhattan whose body was found floating in the Hudson River in 1841. Dupin's final appearance, in "The Purloined Letter", features an investigation of a letter stolen from the French queen. Poe called this story "perhaps, the best of my tales of ratiocination". Throughout the three stories, Dupin travels through three distinct settings. In "The Murders in the Rue Morgue", he travels through city streets; in "The Mystery of Marie Rogêt", he is in the wide outdoors; in "The Purloined Letter", he is in an enclosed private space.

Dupin is not actually a professional detective, and his motivations change through his appearances. In "The Murders in the Rue Morgue", he investigates the murders for his personal amusement, and to prove the innocence of a falsely accused man. He refuses a financial reward. However, in "The Purloined Letter", Dupin purposefully pursues a financial reward.

Dupin's method

While discussing Dupin's method in the light of Charles Sanders Peirce's logic of making good guesses or abductive reasoning, Nancy Harrowitz first quotes Poe's definition of analysis and then shows how "Poe the semiotician is running the gamut of possibilities here—inferences, reasoning backwards, visual, sensual and aural signs, reading faces. Playing cards with the man would have been an interesting experience."

There is considerable controversy about the philosophical nature of Dupin's method. According to biographer Joseph Krutch, Dupin is portrayed as a dehumanized thinking machine, a man whose sole interest is in pure logic. However, Krutch has been accused elsewhere of a "lazy reading" of Poe. According to Krutch, Dupin's deductive prowess is first exhibited when he appears to read the narrator's mind by rationally tracing his train of thought for the previous fifteen minutes. He employs what he terms "ratiocination". Dupin's method is to identify with the criminal and put himself in his mind. By knowing everything that the criminal knows, he can solve any crime. His attitude towards life seems to portray him as a snob who feels that due to his aptitude normal human interaction and relationships are beneath him. In this method, he combines his scientific logic with artistic imagination. As an observer, he pays special attention to what is unintended, such as hesitation, eagerness or a casual or inadvertent word.

Dupin's method also emphasizes the importance of reading and writing: many of his clues come from newspapers or written reports from the Prefect. This device also engages the readers, who follow along by reading the clues themselves.

Inspiration
Poe may have gotten the last name "Dupin" from a character in a series of stories first published Burton's Gentleman's Magazine in 1828 called "Unpublished passages in the Life of Vidocq, the French Minister of Police". The name also implies "duping" or deception, a skill Dupin shows off in "The Purloined Letter." Detective fiction, however, had no real precedent and the word detective had not yet been coined when Poe first introduced Dupin. The closest example in fiction is Voltaire's Zadig (1748), in which the main character performs similar feats of analysis, themselves borrowed from The Three Princes of Serendip, an Italian rendition of a famous poem called Hasht Bihisht written by the Persian poet Amir Khusrau, which itself is based on the Haft Paykar by Nizami, written around 1197 AD, which in turn takes its outline from the earlier epic Shahnameh written by the Persian poet Firdausi around 1010 AD.

In writing the series of Dupin tales, Poe capitalized on contemporary popular interest. His use of an orangutan in "The Murders in the Rue Morgue" was inspired by the popular reaction to an orangutan that had been on display at the Masonic Hall in Philadelphia in July 1839. In "The Mystery of Mary Rogêt", he used a true story that had become of national interest.

It is sometimes speculated that Poe conceived the idea of Dupin from his investigation of the authenticity of an automaton called The Turk, which he published in his essay "Mälzel's Chess Player". At the time, he was working as a reporter for the Southern Literary Messenger.

Literary influence and significance

C. Auguste Dupin is generally acknowledged as the first detective in fiction. The character served as the prototype for many that were created later, including Sherlock Holmes by Arthur Conan Doyle and Hercule Poirot by Agatha Christie. Conan Doyle once wrote, "Each [of Poe's detective stories] is a root from which a whole literature has developed... Where was the detective story until Poe breathed the breath of life into it?"

Many tropes that would later become commonplace in detective fiction first appeared in Poe's stories: the eccentric but brilliant detective, the bumbling constabulary, the first-person narration by a close personal friend. Dupin also initiates the storytelling device where the detective announces his solution and then explains the reasoning leading up to it. Like Sherlock Holmes, Dupin uses his considerable deductive prowess and observation to solve crimes. Poe also portrays the police in an unsympathetic manner as a sort of foil to the detective.

The character helped established the genre of detective fiction, distinct from mystery fiction, with an emphasis on the analysis and not trial-and-error. Brander Matthews wrote: "The true detective story as Poe conceived it is not in the mystery itself, but rather in the successive steps whereby the analytic observer is enabled to solve the problem that might be dismissed as beyond human elucidation." In fact, in the three stories which star Dupin, Poe created three types of detective fiction which established a model for all future stories: the physical type ("The Murders in the Rue Morgue"), the mental ("The Mystery of Marie Rogêt"), and a balanced version of both ("The Purloined Letter").

Fyodor Dostoevsky called Poe "an enormously talented writer" and favorably reviewed Poe's detective stories. The character Porfiry Petrovich in Dostoevsky's novel Crime and Punishment was influenced by Dupin.

Other writers

 In the first Sherlock Holmes story, A Study in Scarlet (1887), Doctor Watson compares Holmes to Dupin, to which Holmes replies: "No doubt you think you are complimenting me ... In my opinion, Dupin was a very inferior fellow... He had some analytical genius, no doubt; but he was by no means such a phenomenon as Poe appears to imagine". Alluding to an episode in "The Murders in the Rue Morgue", where Dupin deduces what his friend is thinking despite their having walked together in silence for a quarter of an hour, Holmes remarks: "That trick of his breaking in on his friend's thoughts with an apropos remark... is really very showy and superficial"; nevertheless, Holmes later performs the same 'trick' on Watson in "The Adventure of the Cardboard Box".
 Louisa May Alcott parodied Dupin and Poe in her 1865 thriller "V.V., or Plots and Counterplots", which has been credited by literary critic Catherine Ross Nickerson as the second-oldest work of modern detective fiction after only Poe's Dupin stories themselves. A short story published anonymously by Alcott, the story concerns a Scottish aristocrat who tries to prove that a mysterious woman has killed his fiancée and cousin. The detective on the case, Antoine Dupres, is a parody of Auguste Dupin who is less concerned with solving the crime as he is in setting up a way to reveal the solution with a dramatic flourish.
 In Murder in the Madhouse (1935), the first of Jonathan Latimer's series of screwball crime novels starring detective William Crane, Crane presents himself in the sanitarium as C. Auguste Dupin. The story contains more oblique references in the form of stylistic elements (offstage murders, Crane's theories of deduction) that suggest Poe had an influence on Latimer's writing.
 Jorge Luis Borges pays homage to Poe's Dupin in "Death and the Compass", by calling his main detective character Erik Lönrott an "Auguste Dupin"-type detective. This is one of the stories published by Borges in his Ficciones (1944). Borges also translated Poe's works into Spanish.
 Dupin had considerable impact on the Agatha Christie character Hercule Poirot, first introduced in The Mysterious Affair at Styles (1920). Later in the fictional detective's life, he writes a book on Edgar Allan Poe in the novel Third Girl (1966).
 Dupin next appears in a series of seven short stories in Ellery Queen's Mystery Magazine by Michael Harrison in the 1960s. The stories were collected by the Publishers Mycroft & Moran in 1968 as The Exploits of Chevalier Dupin. The stories include "The Vanished Treasure" (May 1965) and "The Fires in the Rue St. Honoré" (January 1967). This collection was subsequently published in England by Tom Stacey in 1972 as Murder in the Rue Royale and Further Exploits of the Chevalier Dupin and included a further five stories written since the original publication.
 In The Work of Betrayal (1975) by Mario Brelich – Dupin investigates the mysterious case of Judas Iscariot.
In "The New Murders of the Rue Morgue" (1984), a short story in volume two of Clive Barker's Books of Blood. Set presumably in 1984, the story features Lewis, a descendant of Dupin, who stumbles upon a nearly identical case.
 The Man Who Was Poe, (1991) a juvenile novel by Avi, features Dupin befriending a young boy named Edmund. The two solve mysteries together in Providence, Rhode Island. Dupin is revealed to be Edgar Allan Poe himself.
 Novelist George Egon Hatvary uses Dupin in his novel The Murder of Edgar Allan Poe (1997) as detective and narrator. Dupin travels to America to investigate the circumstances of Poe's mysterious death in 1849. In the novel, Dupin and Poe became friends when Poe stayed in Paris in 1829, and it was Poe who assisted Dupin in the three cases about which Poe wrote. Hatvary writes that Dupin resembles Poe, so much so that several people confuse the two on first sight.
 Dupin makes a guest appearance in the first two issues of Alan Moore's The League of Extraordinary Gentlemen, Volume I (1999) graphic novel series, helping to track down and subdue the monstrous, Hulk-like Mr. Hyde (who is living secretly in Paris after faking the death described in The Strange Case of Dr Jekyll and Mr Hyde and is the actual murderer from Dupin's first short story). He informs the protagonists (Mina Murray from Dracula, Allan Quatermain from King Solomon's Mines and Captain Nemo from Twenty Thousand Leagues Under the Sea) that the murders in the Rue Morgue have started to happen again, one of the first victims being Anna "Nana" Coupeau.
 The Black Throne (2002) by Roger Zelazny & Fred Saberhagen – is a novel about Poe which has an appearance by Dupin.
 Dupin is the hero of Les ogres de Montfaucon by Gérard Dôle (2004), a collection of thirteen detective stories set in the 19th century, the last of which (« Le drame de Reichenbach ») also provides a link with Sherlock Holmes.
 Dupin teams up with the Count of Monte-Cristo to fight Les Habits Noirs in the story The Kind-Hearted Torturer by John Peel published in the anthology Tales of the Shadowmen, Volume 1 (2005).
 The search for the "real Dupin" is at the center of Matthew Pearl's novel The Poe Shadow (2006).
 Dupin makes an appearance, alongside Poe himself, in the novel Edgar Allan Poe on Mars (2007) by Jean-Marc Lofficier & Randy Lofficier.
 Dupin is referenced in The Rook (2008) by Steven James.
 In The Paralogs of Phileas Fogg (2016), author James Downard has Dupin help Fogg and his cohorts resolve some issues during the American leg of their around-the-world adventure.
 C. Auguste Dupin and Edgar Allan Poe are a sleuthing duo in Karen Lee Street's gothic mystery trilogy: Edgar Allan Poe and the London Monster (2016); Edgar Allan Poe and the Jewel of Peru (2018); and Edgar Allan Poe and the Empire of the Dead (2019).

Direct adaptations

Film
Sherlock Holmes in the Great Murder Mystery (1908). An adaptation of The Murders in the Rue Morgue, with Sherlock Holmes replacing Dupin.
The Murders in the Rue Morgue (1914).
Murders  in the Rue Morgue (1932). A loose Universal horror dramatisation starring Bela Lugosi with Leon Ames as Pierre Dupin.
The Mystery of Marie Roget (1942). Patric Knowles stars as Dr. Paul Dupin.
Phantom of the Rue Morgue (1954). Starring Steve Forrest as Professor Paul Dupin.
Murders in the Rue Morgue (1971). A very loose adaptation which does not feature Dupin.
Morgue Street (2012). An Italian short film based on The Murders in the Rue Morgue. Dupin does not appear.

Television
Suspense: The Purloined Letter (1952). An episode of a CBS anthology series. Dupin does not appear.
Detective: The Murders in the Rue Morgue (1968). An episode of a BBC anthology series. Edward Woodward portrays Dupin. Here the anonymous narrator from the stories is depicted as Poe himself (played by Charles Kay).
Le double assassinat de la rue Morgue (1973). A French TV Film starring Daniel Gélin as Dupin.
Les grands détectives: Le Chevalier Dupin: La lettre volée (1975). An episode of a French anthology series, adapting The Purloined Letter. Laurent Terzieff portrays as Dupin.
The Murders in the Rue Morgue (1986). A CBS TV movie. George C. Scott plays an ageing Dupin. The film presents Dupin as a retired police detective, who lives with his daughter, Claire (Rebecca De Mornay). Dupin becomes involved in the case, after his daughter's fiancé becomes a suspect for the murders. Here the anonymous narrator from the stories is named Phillipe Huron (Val Kilmer).
Wishbone: The Pawloined Paper (1995).
 Carl Lumbly will portray Dupin in The Fall of the House of Usher, an upcoming Netflix miniseries adapting Poe's non-Dupin short story.

Radio
In 1948, NBC University Theater aired an adaptation of The Purloined Letter starring Adolphe Menjou as Dupin. The anonymous narrator was presented as Poe himself (voiced by John Newland).
On January 7, 1975, an adaptation of Murders in the Rue Morgue was aired on CBS Radio Mystery Theater.
In 2011, The Murders in the Rue Morgue was adapted as the debut episode of the BBC Radio detective anthology series The Rivals, starring James Fleet as the Sherlock Holmes supporting character Inspector Lestrade. Andrew Scott portrayed Dupin.

Other media depictions

Dupin (played by Joseph Cotten) is a character in the 1951 Fletcher Markle film The Man with a Cloak. Dupin's true identity is revealed at the end of the film to be Poe himself.

In 1988 BBC Radio broadcast two plays about featuring Dupin and Poe.
The Real Mystery of Marie Roget features Dupin (Terry Molloy) visiting Poe (Ed Bishop) during his final night of life, to discuss the Mary Rogers murder. The Strange Case of Edgar Allan Poe depicts Dupin (John Moffatt) investigating the death of Poe (Kerry Shale).

In May 2004, Dupin appeared on stage in Murder by Poe, an Off-Broadway production dramatizing a series of Poe stories, including The Murders in the Rue Morgue. Dupin was played by Spencer Aste.

In the comic series Batman Confidential, the creation of Batman's crime-solving super-computer which is linked to Interpol, FBI, and CIA databases is introduced. Commonly known as the "Bat Computer," it is originally nicknamed "Dupin," after Batman's "hero."

In children's book The Vile Village, Count Olaf disguises himself as "Detective Dupin" in order to falsely accuse the protagonists of murder.

In the comic series The League of Extraordinary Gentlemen Dupin appears as a minor character; we first meet him shortly after Mina Murray and Allan Quatermain arrive in Paris, France in late June 1898.

Notes

References
 
 
 
 
 
 
 
 


External links

 C. Auguste Dupin – the predecessor of Sherlock Holmes

America's Best Comics characters
Edgar Allan Poe
Fictional amateur detectives
Fictional French people in literature
Fictional French police detectives
Fictional gentleman detectives
Literary characters introduced in 1841